Monsters, Inc. (also known as Monsters, Incorporated) is a media franchise owned by The Walt Disney Company. The franchise takes place in a fictional universe where monsters are the primary citizens of a society and harness the energy of human children to power their cities. The company known as Monsters, Inc. accomplishes this by patenting doors which lead to their worlds.

Feature films

Monsters, Inc. (2001)

Monsters, Inc. introduces the monster world, where Monstropolis is powered by the screams of human children as monsters enter the human world at night. When a little girl called "Boo" accidentally enters the monster world, friends James P. Sullivan and Mike Wazowski must find a way to hide her from the authorities and return her to her world and, in the process, learn that not everything they have been led to believe about humans is true.

The film was released on November 2, 2001, in the United States, surpassing Toy Story 2 and peaked as the second highest-grossing animated film of all time, behind 1994's The Lion King at the time. It was one of the first animated films to be nominated for the Academy Award for Best Animated Feature but lost to Shrek.

Monsters University (2013)

A prequel to the first film, Monsters University tells Sulley and Mike's backstory. The future friends meet at college and initially start off as enemies, but end up on the same team in the university's "Scare Games", where they and their team of misfits must beat the odds and win the competition, or be expelled from school. As the team struggles, the two learn to work together, and slowly become best friends.

The film was released on June 21, 2013 in the United States.

Television series

Monsters at Work is a television series spin-off of Monsters, Inc. produced by Disney Television Animation for Disney+. It was announced in a Disney press release on November 9, 2017 as part of a list of in development series for The Walt Disney Company's then-upcoming streaming service. On April 9, 2019, it was revealed that the show would be titled Monsters at Work and premiere in spring 2021. Seven of the original cast would return, including John Goodman and Billy Crystal reprising their roles as Sulley and Mike, respectively. On February 24, 2021, it was announced that it would be released on July 2, followed by a delay to July 7.

The series begins the day after Monsters, Incorporated has switched to laugh power and follows a young eager mechanic, Tylor Tuskmon (Ben Feldman), who hopes to be promoted to the Laugh Floor alongside Mike and Sulley.

Short films

Mike's New Car (2002)

Party Central (2013)

Party Central is a six-minute short animated film, featuring characters from Monsters University. It premiered on August 9, 2013, at the D23 Expo. The short was set to be released theatrically with The Good Dinosaur in 2014, before the film was pushed back to 2015. Instead, it was theatrically released on March 21, 2014, with Muppets Most Wanted. The short was written and directed by Kelsey Mann, story supervisor on Monsters University. The cast consists of Billy Crystal, John Goodman, Peter Sohn, Julia Sweeney, Charlie Day, Nathan Fillion, Dave Foley, Sean Hayes, Bobby Moynihan, and Joel Murray.

In the short set after sulley got the promotion to CEO, the Oozma Kappa fraternity organizes a party, but no one shows up. To solve the problem, they use door stations to steal visitors from the biggest party going on at another fraternity.

Reception

Box office performance
The film series has grossed a total of $1,306,110,769, making the Monsters, Inc. franchise the 14th highest-grossing animated film franchise.

Monsters, Inc. ranked  1 at the box office its opening weekend, grossing $62,577,067 in North America alone. The film had a small drop-off of 27.2% over its second weekend, earning another $45,551,028. In its third weekend, the film experienced a larger decline of 50.1%, placing itself in the second position just after Harry Potter and the Philosopher's Stone. In its fourth weekend, however, there was an increase of 5.9%. Making $24,055,001 that weekend for a combined total of over $562 million. It is the seventh biggest (in US$) fourth weekend ever for a film.

Monsters University has earned $268,227,670 in North America, and $475,066,843 in other territories, for a worldwide total of $743,294,513. The film earned $136.9 million on its opening weekend worldwide. For unknown reasons, Disney declined to provide a budget for the film, although BoxOffice.com cites a budget of a total of $270 million. Entertainment Weekly speculated that it was higher than that of Brave ($185 million), mostly due to high cost of John Goodman and Billy Crystal reprising their roles. Shockya, a subsidiary website of CraveOnline, estimated the budget to be $200 million, on par with Toy Story 3 and Cars 2.

Critical and public response

Cast and characters

Crew

Video games
 Monsters, Inc. (Game Boy Color, Game Boy Advance, PlayStation 2)
 Monsters, Inc. Scream Team (PlayStation, Microsoft Windows, PlayStation 2)
 Monsters, Inc. Scream Arena (GameCube)
 Monsters, Inc. Scream Team Training (Microsoft Windows, Mac OS X)
Monsters, Inc. Bowling for Screams (Microsoft Windows, Mac OS X)
Monsters, Inc. Eight Ball Chaos (Microsoft Windows, Mac OS X)
Monsters, Inc. Monster Tag (Microsoft Windows, Mac OS X)
Monsters, Inc. Pinball Panic (Microsoft Windows, Mac OS X)
 Mike's Monstrous Adventure (Microsoft Windows, Mac OS X)
 Cars Mater-National Championship (PlayStation 2, PlayStation 3, Xbox 360, Microsoft Windows, Nintendo DS, Game Boy Advance, Wii)
 Cars Race-O-Rama (PlayStation 2, PlayStation 3, Xbox 360, Wii, Nintendo DS, PlayStation Portable)
 Monsters, Inc. Run (iOS)
 Monsters University: Catch Archie (Android, iOS)
 Disney Infinity (PlayStation 3, Xbox 360, Wii, Wii U, Nintendo 3DS)
 Disney Magic Kingdoms (Android, iOS, Microsoft Windows)
 Lego The Incredibles (PlayStation 4, Xbox One, Nintendo Switch, Microsoft Windows, macOS)
 Kingdom Hearts III (PlayStation 4, Xbox One, Nintendo Switch, Microsoft Windows)
 Disney Heroes: Battle Mode (Android, iOS)
 Disney Mirrorverse (Android, iOS)
 Disney Dreamlight Valley (PlayStation 4, PlayStation 5, Xbox One, Xbox Series X/S, Nintendo Switch, Microsoft Windows, macOS)

Theme park attractions

Monsters, Inc. Laugh Floor

Monsters, Inc. Laugh Floor is an interactive animated comedy club show attraction based on the Monsters, Inc. franchise in Tomorrowland at Magic Kingdom at the Walt Disney World Resort in Orlando, Florida.

It  opened on April 2, 2007, replacing the Circle-Vision attraction The Timekeeper. The characters from the 2001 and 2013 Disney/Pixar animated films Monsters, Inc. and Monsters University that appear in the attraction are Mike Wazowski (Billy Crystal) and Roz (Bob Peterson). By November 2006, the attraction as Monsters, Inc. Laugh Floor Comedy Club was going through a testing phase with expect regular operation in January 2007. The attraction was nominated for the 6th Annual VES Awards - Outstanding Visual Effects in a Special Venue Project in 2008, but lost to Dinosaurs - Giants of Patagonia.

Subsequent to the 2013 release of Monsters University, a new "commercial" sequence was added during the pre-show which has Monsters University student Art (Charlie Day) advertise the "Monsters University School of Laughter", replacing the "Comedy Detection Agency" sequence that Wazowski introduces.

On October 27, 2020, since Walt Disney World reopened, after being temporarily closed during the COVID-19 pandemic, Walt Disney World announced that all recent entertainment shows are laid off, such as Citizens of Hollywood at Disney's Hollywood Studios, due to a dispute between the Actors' Equity Association and Walt Disney World. This included the cast doing live voice for Monsters, Inc. Laugh Floor.

Monsters, Inc. Mike & Sulley to the Rescue!

Monsters, Inc. Mike & Sulley to the Rescue!  is a dark ride attraction in Hollywood Land at Disney California Adventure at the Disneyland Resort in Anaheim, California. It is based on the 2001 Disney/Pixar animated film Monsters, Inc. It opened on January 22, 2006. The audio animatronic of Roz is the only figure in the ride that is fully animated, complete with a moving mouth and interactivity. The attraction replaced the short-lived Superstar Limo dark ride.

This attraction had two major closures: on April 15, 2012 before, during, and after the deresolution (derezzolution) of ElecTRONica (albeit with scaffolding, yellow/brown canvas, and scrims covering the building alongside blue construction walls) and in August-September 2022 with scaffolding, blue canvas, and scrims covering the building alongside large yellow construction walls.

Monsters, Inc. Ride & Go Seek

Similar to Mike & Sulley to the Rescue!, Ride & Go Seek is an interactive dark ride attraction in Tokyo Disneyland at Tokyo Disney Resort.

References

 
Pixar franchises
Film series introduced in 2001
Recurring events established in 2001
Animated film series
Computer-animated films
Film franchises
Children's film series